Giovan Oniangue (born April 22, 1991) is a Congolese professional basketball player for Élan Béarnais of the French Pro A.

Professional career
He signed with Orleans in January 2019, and averaged 7.8 points and 3.1 rebounds per game during the 2019-20 season. On May 29, 2020, he signed a two-year extension.

On August 23, 2021, he has signed with Élan Béarnais of the French Pro A.

International career
He represented the Republic of the Congo's national basketball team at the AfroBasket 2013 in Abidjan, Ivory Coast, where he was his team’s top scorer.

References

External links
 Profile at Paris-Levallois's website
 Scout Basketball profile
 Eurobasket.com profile
 Basketball-Reference.com profile

1991 births
Living people
Élan Béarnais players
Orléans Loiret Basket players
Metropolitans 92 players
Republic of the Congo men's basketball players
Small forwards
Sportspeople from Brazzaville